Lisa Edelstein (born May 21, 1966) is an American actress and artist. She is known for playing Dr. Lisa Cuddy on the Fox medical drama series House, M.D. (2004–2011). Between 2014 and 2018, Edelstein starred as Abby McCarthy in the Bravo series Girlfriends' Guide to Divorce.

Early life
Edelstein was born in Boston, Massachusetts, to Bonnie and Alvin Edelstein, the youngest of three children in a Jewish family. Her father worked as a pediatrician at Chilton Memorial Hospital. She was raised in Wayne, New Jersey, and attended Wayne Valley High School, graduating in 1984.

At 16, Edelstein was a cheerleader for the New Jersey Generals. Edelstein participated in a protest against poor working conditions. She said she felt they were treated "like hookers" and helped organize a cheerleader walkout.

While living in New York, she became involved in the club scene (known there only as "Lisa E”) with “celebutant" James St. James, who briefly refers to Edelstein in his 1999 book Disco Bloodbath. She caused enough of a stir in the community to be dubbed New York City’s “Queen of the Night” by Maureen Dowd in The New York Times in 1986 in a feature article entitled “Lisa In Wonderland."

Career

Actress
In response to the growing AIDS crisis of the 1980’s, Edelstein wrote, composed and starred in an original musical called Positive Me which she performed at La MaMa Experimental Theatre Club in New York City, receiving many accolades. She followed that with a short stint hosting MTV’s Awake on the Wild Side in 1990, then began working in earnest as an actress. She got her SAG card appearing as a backstage make-up artist in Oliver Stone's Jim Morrison biography The Doors, and then landed a quick series of guest roles on several popular comedies, including Mad About You, Wings, The Larry Sanders Show and Sports Night, where she played a sports reporter who claimed to be a former lover of Josh Charles' character whom he did not remember. Perhaps most famous from this time was her appearances on Seinfeld, where she played George Costanza's girlfriend in the episodes "The Mango” and "The Masseuse.”

 
Bigger roles in TV dramas soon followed, among them the lesbian sister on ABC's Relativity (1996); a high-priced call girl turned Rob Lowe's date on The West Wing (1999); a transgender woman on Ally McBeal (2000); and Ben Covington's (Scott Speedman) girlfriend on Felicity (2001). She also continued to land guest-star spots on such shows as ER, Frasier, Just Shoot Me!, Without a Trace, and Judging Amy, as well as small parts in the films What Women Want, Keeping the Faith, As Good as It Gets, and Daddy Day Care.

From 2004 to 2011, she portrayed her biggest and most notable role to date, Dr. Lisa Cuddy, the Dean of Medicine at Princeton-Plainsboro Teaching Hospital and frequent adversary, friend, and eventual girlfriend of title character Gregory House (Hugh Laurie) on Fox's TV series House. Edelstein has often spoken fondly of her experiences on the show and fellow cast and crew, especially her friendship and strong working relationship with Laurie.

In May 2011, Edelstein announced that she would not return for the eighth and final season of House. Starting in June 2011, she joined the cast of The Good Wife where she played lawyer Celeste Serrano. She guest-starred in Scandal in 2013, and later three episodes of the ABC series Castle.

In 2014, Edelstein got her dream job landing the lead role of Abby McCarthy in the Bravo series Girlfriends' Guide to Divorce, an hour-long dramedy loosely based on the book series by Vicki Iovine focusing on the lives of newly divorced, mid-life women. It ran for five seasons in which she got to expand her creative participation by becoming a producer, writer and director on the series.

In 2018, Edelstein joined the cast of ABC's The Good Doctor in season two as Dr. Marina Blaize in a recurring role. This reunited her with House creator David Shore as well as with Richard Schiff, who played her father on Relativity. 

Edelstein then joined the award winning The Kominsky Method, a Netflix series that debuted in November 2018, playing the drug addled daughter of Alan Arkin and working alongside such actors such as Michael Douglas, Paul Reiser and Chuck Lorre. During that time she also reunited with Rob Lowe, playing his ex-wife Gwyneth Morgan, and mother of TK Strand (Ronen Rubenstein) on the ABC drama series, 9-1-1: Lone Star.

Throughout her career has lent her voice to several animated programs, including King of the Hill, American Dad!, Superman: The Animated Series (as Mercy Graves, Lex Luthor's bodyguard, a role she later reprised in several episodes of Justice League), The Legend of Korra (as Kya, Tenzin's sister) and the first video game adaptation of Blade Runner.

Other appearances
Edelstein is a supporter of Best Friends Animal Society, of which she is an Ambassador. She supports human rights organizations and is a patron of the arts. She has appeared in numerous magazines, including the September 2010 cover of H magazine. She posed for PETA in an ad promoting vegetarianism, a diet she has followed for most of her life.

Art 

In the wake of the COVID-19 pandemic in 2020, Edelstein began to sketch and paint. She began working with magic marker and at the suggestion of her artist husband Robert Russell, switched to watercolor as the size of each piece grew. Edelstein's portfolio is inspired by old family photographs that are “unintended moments, telling unintended truths”. In December 2022, her exhibition "Lisa Edelstein: Family” debuted at Lisa Schiff's SFA Advisory gallery in Tribeca, New York. Her collection has been featured in Forbes, Surface, and Gio Journal.

Personal life 
On May 25, 2014, Edelstein married artist Robert Russell in Los Angeles. She became a stepmother to Russell's two sons from a previous marriage.

Filmography

Film

Television

Video games

Podcasts

Awards
Edelstein has been nominated by the Screen Actors Guild for the following performances:
15th SAG Awards: Outstanding Performance by an Ensemble in a Drama, nomination, for House (2009)
26th SAG Awards: Outstanding Performance by an Ensemble in a Comedy, nomination, for The Kominsky Method (2020)
28th SAG Awards: Outstanding Performance by an Ensemble in a Comedy, nomination, for The Kominsky Method (2022) 
Edelstein has won the International Press Academy's Satellite Awards for the following performances: 

 10th Satellite Awards: Outstanding Actress in a Supporting Role in a Series, winner, for House (2005)
 26th Satellite Awards: Outstanding Actress in a Supporting Role in a Series, winner, for The Kominsky Method (2021)

In 2011, she won the People's Choice Award for Best Drama Actress in a TV Series for her portrayal of Dr. Lisa Cuddy on House.

Edelstein has won the Women's Image Network Awards for the following performances:

 17th WIN Awards: Outstanding Actress in a Comedy Series, winner, for Girlfriend's Guide to Divorce (2015)
 18th WIN Awards: Outstanding Actress in a Comedy Series, winner, for Girlfriend's Guide to Divorce (2016)

References

External links

 
 
 Lisa Edelstein's artist page on La MaMa's Digital Collections Website

1966 births
Actresses from Boston
Actresses from Massachusetts
Actresses from New Jersey
American film actresses
American cheerleaders
American television actresses
American voice actresses
Club Kids
Circle in the Square Theatre School alumni
Jewish American actresses
Living people
People from Wayne, New Jersey
Wayne Valley High School alumni
Tisch School of the Arts alumni
20th-century American actresses
21st-century American actresses
American women dramatists and playwrights
Writers from Boston
Writers from New Jersey